Chairman's Cup is the name of 2 Football (Soccer) competitions:

HKFA Chairman's Cup, a competition for the reserve teams of Hong Kong First Division clubs.
Northern Premier League Chairman's Cup, an annual game played between the champions of the Northern Premier League Division One North and South